Vasantham is a Singaporean free-to-air television channel owned by Mediacorp. The network is focused towards the Singaporean Indian community in the country. It was originally launched on 1 September 1995 as Premiere 12. Tamil programming was included on 30 January 2000 when the channel was rebranded as Central as Vasantham Central, and was later rebranded again as an independent Tamil-language channel on 19 October 2008. As of 1 February 2023, the channel's logo is based on the corporate Mplifier graphics format, with the channel name in blue text (replacing the former flower-inspired logo) placed beside the Mediacorp "M" logo.

History 
Tamil programming was originally shown on Channel 8 from its launch on 23 November 1963 until 1 September 1995, when it became a standalone Mandarin-language channel. After this, Tamil programming transferred to the new channel Prime 12. On 30 January 2000, as Prime 12 was rebranded to Suria and became a standalone Malay-language channel, Tamil programming transferred to the new channel Central, with Vasantham Central as its timebelt for Indian programming.

On 19 October 2008, Vasantham started broadcasting as an independent Tamil-language network focused on the Indian community living in Singapore, first announced on 29 February that year.

Programming

Current programming
 Ennuyire
 Kalyanam
 Janani D/O Madhavan
 Kannadi Pookal (TV series)
 Neeya
 Nijangal
 Ragasiyam
 Vallamai Tharayo
 Vettai
 Alaipayuthey
 Iruvar (TV series)
 Janani D/O Madhavan (season 2)
 Ithu Namma Veedu
 Neo
Moodravathu Kann

References

External links 
 Vasantham Official Website

2008 establishments in Singapore
Tamil-language television channels
Tamil-language television stations in Singapore
Mass media in Singapore
Mediacorp
 
Television channels and stations established in 2008